Laurel Dale is an unincorporated community on New Creek in Mineral County, West Virginia, United States. Laurel Dale was established in 1878. The community is located along West Virginia Route 93.

The community was named for laurel plants near the original town site.

References

Unincorporated communities in Mineral County, West Virginia
Unincorporated communities in West Virginia